Dabuyin Wan is a dark brownish-black water-honeyed pill used in Traditional Chinese medicine to "nourish yin and to lower fire". It is used in cases where there is "deficiency of yin accompanied with flaming-up of evil fire manifested by daily recurring fever, night sweating, cough, hemoptysis, tinnitus and seminal emission". It tastes bitter, slightly sweet and  astringent.

Chinese classic herbal formula

See also
 Chinese classic herbal formula
 Bu Zhong Yi Qi Wan

References

Traditional Chinese medicine pills